Gary Kavanagh is a former Gaelic footballer from County Laois.

He played for the Stradbally club. He usually played at wing forward for the Laois senior football team and in 2003 was part of the Laois team that won the Leinster Senior Football Championship title for the first time since 1946.

Kavanagh emerged on to the inter-county GAA scene in 1997 as part of the Laois minor squad that retained the All-Ireland Minor Football Championship.

In 2006, he was named as captain of the Laois senior football team but did not hold down a regular starting place on the team.

In January 2012, Kavanagh called time on his inter-county career and has since moved into management having taken charge of Laois under 21's, Ballylinan, Gracefield and Courtwood.

References

1979 births
Living people
Laois inter-county Gaelic footballers
Stradbally (Laois) Gaelic footballers